Circaetinae is a bird of prey subfamily which consists of a group of medium to large broad-winged species. These are mainly birds which specialise in feeding on snakes and other reptiles, which is the reason most are referred to as "snake-eagles" or "serpent-eagles". The exceptions are the bateleur, a more generalised hunter, and the Philippine eagle, which preys on mammals and birds.

All but one of the subfamily are restricted to warmer parts of the Old World: Spilornis and Pithecophaga in south Asia, the others in Africa. The short-toed eagle Circaetus gallicus migrates between temperate Eurasia and Africa, as well as being resident in India.

They have hooked beaks for tearing flesh from their prey, strong legs and powerful talons. They also have extremely keen eyesight to enable them to spot potential prey from a distance.

Species
The following taxonomy is based on the International Ornithological Congress.

Notes

 
Bird subfamilies
Eagles
Accipitridae